Eddie Owens (born December 26, 1953) is an American former basketball player who played briefly in the National Basketball Association (NBA).

As a high school player, Owens was named a third-team All-American by Parade Magazine in 1973.  Owens played college basketball at UNLV and was drafted by the Kansas City Kings in the second round of the 1977 NBA draft.  He played for the Buffalo Braves during the 1977–78 season.  He appeared in eight games for the Braves, averaging 2.6 points. He is the all-time leading scorer for UNLV.

References

1953 births
Living people
American men's basketball players
Basketball players from Houston
Buffalo Braves players
Kansas City Kings draft picks
Parade High School All-Americans (boys' basketball)
Rochester Zeniths players
Small forwards
UNLV Runnin' Rebels basketball players